Maurice Baudoux  (July 10, 1902 – July 1, 1988) was a Canadian priest and the Archbishop of Saint Boniface, Manitoba, Canada.

Born in La Louvière, Belgium, he came to Canada when he was nine. He studied at Collège universitaire de Saint-Boniface, an Edmonton seminary, and at Université Laval where he received his doctorate in theology. He was ordained in 1929 and was a Priest in Prud'homme, Saskatchewan. From 1948 to 1952, he was the first Bishop of Saint Paul, Alberta. He became Archbishop of Saint-Boniface in 1955. He resigned in 1974.

In 1979, he was made an Officer of the Order of Canada "in recognition of the fifty years he devoted to the promotion of the French fact in western Canada through his work with many religious, cultural and educational organizations". In 1980, he was awarded an honorary Doctor of Laws from the University of Saskatchewan.

References

External links
 Catholic hierarchy profile

1902 births
1988 deaths
20th-century Roman Catholic archbishops in Canada
Participants in the Second Vatican Council
Belgian emigrants to Canada
Canadian people of Walloon descent
Franco-Manitoban people
Officers of the Order of Canada
People from Saint Boniface, Winnipeg
University of Saskatchewan alumni
Université Laval alumni
Roman Catholic bishops of Saint Paul, Alberta
Roman Catholic archbishops of Saint Boniface